Dudu Biton  (born 1 March 1988) is an Israeli footballer who plays as a striker for Maccabi Jaffa.

Career

Club
Biton played in the youth clubs of Beitar Nes Tubruk and Maccabi Haifa. He made his debut for Maccabi Haifa in Ligat ha'Al on 12 May 2006 in the last league fixture against Bnei Sakhnin, becoming a league champion. This was his only appearance for the senior team and during 2006–07 season he returned to Beitar Nes Tubruk.

Later he played for Maccabi Tel Aviv for one season before signing in Hapoel Ra'anana from Liga Leumit, where he took part of their historic promotion to Ligat ha'Al, their first since the club inception. On 16 July 2010, after two seasons with Hapoel Ra'anana, Biton signing in Hapoel Petah Tikva, just five days later he scored his first goal for Hapoel Petah Tikva in their loss against Hapoel Ashkelon.

On 4 January 2011, Biton signed with Charleroi from the bottom of the Belgian Pro League, which was relegated at the end of the 2010–11 season. After the season, Biton signed a one-year loan deal with Polish Ekstraklasa side Wisła Kraków. On 11 June 2012, he transferred to Standard Liège for an undisclosed fee, signing a four-year contract.

On 25 January 2013, Biton joined Cypriot side APOEL on a loan deal from Standard Liège until the end of 2012–13 season. Biton scored on his debut against Nea Salamina at GSP Stadium on 2 February 2013, just five minutes after being subbed in the 85th minute, to make the final score 2–0 for APOEL. He also scored in the following two matches, counting in total three goals in his first three appearances with APOEL. During his loan spell at APOEL, Biton scored six goals in 13 appearances and helped the club to win the 2012–13 Cypriot First Division.

On 13 January 2014, Biton joined Spanish second division team AD Alcorcón on a loan deal from Standard Liège until the end of 2013–14 season.

On January 16, 2015, Biton joined on loan Israeli first division team Hapoel Tel Aviv, signing a half year contract.

Statistics
 As of: 6 December 2014

Honours

Player

Club

Maccabi Haifa
Israeli Premier League: 2005–06

Hapoel Ra'anana
Toto Cup Al: Runner-up: 2009–10

APOEL
First Division: 2012–13

Maribor
Slovenian PrvaLiga: 2014–15

References

External links
 APOEL official profile
 
 
 NK Maribor profile 

1988 births
Living people
Israeli Jews
Israeli footballers
Association football forwards
Footballers from Netanya
Beitar Nes Tubruk F.C. players
Maccabi Haifa F.C. players
Maccabi Tel Aviv F.C. players
Hapoel Ra'anana A.F.C. players
Hapoel Petah Tikva F.C. players
R. Charleroi S.C. players
Wisła Kraków players
Standard Liège players
APOEL FC players
AD Alcorcón footballers
NK Maribor players
Hapoel Tel Aviv F.C. players
Hapoel Kfar Saba F.C. players
Hapoel Acre F.C. players
F.C. Ashdod players
Hapoel Haifa F.C. players
Hapoel Afula F.C. players
Sektzia Ness Ziona F.C. players
Maccabi Petah Tikva F.C. players
Maccabi Jaffa F.C. players
Israeli Premier League players
Liga Leumit players
Belgian Pro League players
Ekstraklasa players
Cypriot First Division players
Segunda División players
Slovenian PrvaLiga players
Israeli expatriate footballers
Expatriate footballers in Belgium
Expatriate footballers in Poland
Expatriate footballers in Cyprus
Expatriate footballers in Spain
Expatriate footballers in Slovenia
Israeli expatriate sportspeople in Belgium
Israeli expatriate sportspeople in Poland
Israeli expatriate sportspeople in Cyprus
Israeli expatriate sportspeople in Spain
Israeli expatriate sportspeople in Slovenia
Israel under-21 international footballers